Cha-2 or No. 2 (Japanese: 第二號驅潜特務艇) was a No.1-class auxiliary submarine chaser of the Imperial Japanese Navy that served during World War II.

History
She was laid down on 7 February 1942 at the Ishinomaki shipyard of Shanxi Shipbuilding Iron Works Co., Ltd. (山西造船鉄工所) and launched on 5 August 1942. She was fitted with armaments at the Yokosuka Naval Arsenal, completed and commissioned on 15 March 1943, and assigned to the Yokosuka Defense Force, Yokosuka Naval District, where she served in waters around Japan as an escort and sub chaser. On 1 June 1943, she was reassigned to the Southwest Area Fleet.

She was removed from the Navy List on 3 May 1947.

References

1942 ships
Maritime incidents in October 1944
World War II shipwrecks in the Pacific Ocean
Ships sunk by British submarines
No.1-class auxiliary submarine chasers
Auxiliary ships of the Imperial Japanese Navy